Asteromyrtus tranganensis is a species of plant in the myrtle family Myrtaceae that is native to the Aru Islands group of the Maluku archipelago of Indonesia.

References

 

 
tranganensis
Flora of the Maluku Islands
Plants described in 1989